Megateuthis gigantea is the largest known belemnite species, reaching about 50 mm and 700mm in maximum diameter and length of rostrum, respectively. The fossil remains were discovered in Europe and Asia.

See also

 Cephalopod size
 List of belemnites

References

Jurassic cephalopods
Jurassic animals of Asia
Prehistoric animals of Europe
Belemnoidea